The Men's triple jump event at the 2006 European Athletics Championships was held at the Ullevi on August 10 and August 12.

Medalists

Abbreviations
All results shown are in metres

Schedule

Records

Results

Qualification
Qualification: Qualifying Performance 16.95 (Q) or at least 12 best performers (q) advance to the final.

Final

External links
Results

Triple jump
Triple jump at the European Athletics Championships